Breton Women is an 1888 watercolour painting by Vincent van Gogh, copying a work by Émile Bernard, a friend of both van Gogh and Paul Gauguin who also produced Breton Women at a Wall on a similar subject. It is now in the collection of the Galleria d'arte moderna in Milan.

References

Watercolor paintings
Paintings by Vincent van Gogh
Paintings in the Galleria d'Arte Moderna, Milan
1888 paintings